"Hellfire Gala" is a comic book storyline published by Marvel Comics through the X-Men related title. It is the first storyline featured in the "Reign of X" relaunch after the "X of Swords" storyline. It is a twelve-chapter storyline. Krakoa opens its gates to non-mutants to celebrate mutant culture at an evening party. The gala unveiled the new team of X-Men and showcased the terraforming of Mars into Planet Arrako.

Plot

Lead-up 
The gala was first mentioned during a conversation between Emma Frost and Callisto when the former asked the latter to be the White Knight of the Hellfire Trading Company.

Emma Frost asks Magneto to procure and develop an island as a secondary base of operations for the Hellfire Trading Company.

Emma Frost invites the Inner Circle to the Island of Mykines and announces that they will be hosting mutantkind's first state dinner. Kitty Pryde sends the first invitation to the Homines Verendi.

Cyclops and Jean Grey co-lead a new X-Men team; an election is to be held and the unveiling of the team is to be announced at the Hellfire Gala.

Captain America meets with Cyclops at Westchester, questioning the expansion of Krakoa and mutant population.

Magneto discusses his plans for Arakko to Isca the Unbeaten and the Quiet Council, and recruits Omega-level mutants from Krakoa and Arakko for the mission.

Event timeline 
The gala starts with an opening remark from Emma Frost and a telepathic concert performed by Rhapsody, Marvel Girl and the Five-in-One.

 7:30 PM: X-Corp arrives at the gala with plans for a back-to-back meeting with potential board members.
 7:40 PM: X-Force welcomes the arriving guests: Avengers, Fantastic Four, Doctor Doom, and ambassadors from various nations.
 8:12 PM: Professor X and Magneto fail to convince Namor to join the Quiet Council.
 8:35 PM: Beast uses the ambassadors from Terra Verde to bug other nations.
 9:00 PM: X-Corp CXOs Angel and Penance meet with Thunderbird for the board position.
 9:30 PM: The Excalibur team arrives. X-Corp CXOs meet with Sunspot for the board position.
 9:31PM: Deadpool attempts to gatecrash the party and is warded off by Wolverine and Domino.
 9:32 PM: Shatterstar proceeds to the gala after his fight with the Morrigan to reunite with Rictor.
 9:59 PM: X-Corp CXOs meet with the Black Priestess for the board position.
 10:04 PM: Beast's telefloronic programming on the Terra Verdan ambassador is hacked and starts attacking the party.
 10:15 PM: Marvel Girl telepathically unites mutants across the planet.
 10:20 PM: Cyclops and Marvel Girl announce the elected X-Men: Rogue, Sunfire, Wolverine, Synch and Polaris.
 10:40 PM: X-Corp CXOs meet with Mastermind for the board position.
 10:45 PM: The uninvited Hellions gatecrash the gala. Havok is arguing for the resurrection of Madelyne Pryor.
 11:00 PM: Ambassador Reuben Brousseau announces that Great Britain has left the Krakoan alliance.
 11:30 PM: Andrea von Strucker sneaks into the X-Corp HQ before being stopped by Penance. The Hellions are teleported away by Magik due to a drunken brawl from the unexpected reunion of Wild Child and Aurora.
 11:35 PM: The Omega-level mutants leave the gala to terraform Mars into Planet Arakko.
 11:40 PM: Noblesse Pharmaceutical rescinds their interest in the board position of X-Corp and decides to go forward with Fenris Consulting, resulting to a fight between Angel and Swordsman.
 11:45 PM: Emma Frost gives the closing remarks and a celebratory fireworks. An afterparty is held on Planet Arakko.
 3:17 AM: Scarlet Witch arrives after the celebrations are over.
 4:04 AM: Prodigy, Eye-Boy and Speed find Scarlet Witch's murdered corpse in the bushes.

During the gala, other things happen on the sidelines and elsewhere:

 Reed Richards whispers something to Professor X that is yet to be revealed.
 The Stepford Cuckoos make Wilhemina Kensington remember something.  The suppressed trauma from her father's abuse externalized into sociopathy, letting her kill animals and people without guilt.
 The ambassadors from Verendi, Great Britain and Russia forge an alliance.
Sinister's clone returns from Amenth.
 Peter Wisdom is killed by Coven Akkaba to free Morgan Le Fay. He is later resurrected by The Five.
 Rictor, with the help of the Druids, creates a new island around the Braddock Lighthouse to annex it from Great Britain.
 Emma Frost deals with members of a hidden society for the Kara Kutuça. Mystique gets the black box for Emma to get her vote in the Quiet Council, which is revealed to be a mysterium puzzle box inscribed with Kate Pryde's name in Krakoan language. 
 Laura and Daken search for Gabby during and after the Gala; Gabby is found dead in the Wild Hunt by Anole, No-Girl, Rain Boy and Cosmar. She is later resurrected by The Five, setting a status quo that clones can be resurrected.
 An unknown assailant attacks Christian Frost while transporting the Shi'ar logic diamonds, and leaves the Marauder burning off the coast of Madripoor. The assailant is revealed to be Solem in his ploy to play games with Wolverine. 
 Henry Peter Gyrich recruits Guardian into ORCHIS. 
 Prodigy sneaks out of the gala to investigate the circumstances of his death.

Aftermath 
S.W.O.R.D. leader Abigail Brand meets with the galactic representatives to acknowledge Planet Arakko as the capital planet of the Sol System, with Storm as the Queen Regent, in exchange for a supply of mysterium.

The murder of Scarlet Witch during the gala is be the focus of Trial of Magneto.

Characters 
 Quiet Council of Krakoa
 Hellfire Trading Company
 X-Men
 Excalibur
 X-Force
 Marauders
 X-Factor Investigations
 New Mutants
 Hellions
 X-Corp
 S.W.O.R.D.
 Avengers 
 Fantastic Four
 United Nations Ambassadors

Issues involved

Collected issues

Reception

Fashion 
The Hellfire Gala, modeled after the real-life Met Gala, is a fancy soiree where guests are expected to show up in high fashion. Most of the formal wear are designed by Russell Dauterman, Alberto Foche, Lucas Werneck, David Baldeón, Matteo Lolli, Stephen Segovia, Bob Quinn, Alex Lins, Valerio Schiti, Marcus To and Joshua Cassara. EW writers Christian Holub and Nick Romano ranked Emma Frost, Storm and Mystique as the best dressed characters in the event.

Storyline 
The creative team agreed that the story and the party were a success.

AIPT reviewer Lia Kolb stated that the storyline suffered from having the event's monumental announcement to be spoiled already by the previous issues in the event and the marketing itself.

Prints

Future 
During Marvel's X-Men Comic-Con At Home panel on SDCC 2021, the X-Men creative team agreed that an annual Hellfire Gala and X-Men vote were warranted.

A second X-Men election was announced with results revealed in the second Hellfire Gala. The one-shot issue addressed the resurrection protocols becoming public knowledge and announced the new roster comprising Cyclops, Marvel Girl, Synch, Firestar, Magik, Forge, Havok and Iceman.

During Marvel's Judgment Day panel on SDCC 2022, Nick Lowe and C.B. Beluski revealed that plans for the X-Men extend to 2024 building towards what Jonathan Hickman planned before he left, including the third annual Hellfire Gala. During the Next Big Thing panel on NYCC 2022, Lowe mentioned that there will be another Hellfire Gala before the Fall of X event.

References

External links
 

X-Men storylines